Kounahiri (also spelled Koumahiri) is a town in central Ivory Coast. It is a sub-prefecture of and the seat of Kounahiri Department in Béré Region, Woroba District. Kounahiri is also a commune.
In 2014, the population of the sub-prefecture of Kounahiri was 42,037.

Villages
The thirty one villages of the sub-prefecture of Kounahiri and their population in 2014 are:

Notes

Sub-prefectures of Béré Region
Communes of Béré Region